Ortari is a mountain located within near the northwest of the city of Kymi on the island of Euboea.

The northern sides form a spectacular geological terrain, with nearly vertical slopes above the Aegean Sea. It has one of the highest vertical cliffs above the sea in Europe.  At some points at the base of the cliffs are formed small beaches. The highest peak, which called Ortari, has an altitude of 869m and is located just above the sea. When the weather is clear, especially in the winter, visitors are able to see over a distance of 100 nautical miles many Aegean islands. Also visible are the three peninsulas of Chalkidiki, the main Mount Athos, mountains Olympus, Pelion, and many of the peaks of Central Greece.

Flora and fauna
Maple, ostryes, splinter faction fir dries, holiday trees, wild olive, chestnut, strawberry, agkortzies, friendly, pournargia, kissourgia, bury, tsetserifa and several other species. In this mountain there are many herbs, oregano, savory, thyme, mint, melissa.

Important and rare wildflowers are someone encountered by the visitor to Ortari. Peonies, lilium chalcedonicum, rings, orchids, eyebrows, bluebells, lilies and several endemics are the major flowers. Very important are the flora and avifauna of the mountain. Foxes, wild goats, wild sheep, ferrets, weasels, squirrels, hares, hedgehogs and a large number of reptiles have their habitat on Ortari. The avifauna is excellent and rare with nearly 100 different bird species recorded. Eagles, buzzards, hawks and many other birds of prey nest here while older vultures and buzzards build their nests on the steep slopes of the mountain.

Access
Access to the top of the slope-cliff of 869 meters is easy from the south side of the mountain, and there is a dirt road approaching one kilometre from the top. After walking 30 minutes you are in the highest slope-cliff of Europe over marine environment. The mountain has suffered in recent years from illegal and "legal" logging, overgrazing, illegal poisons and risks of placing wind farms #wind turbines#. Illegal encroachments of small beaches and Thapsa Tsilaro and the illegal building of houses has degraded significantly the stunning image of the mountain.

Mountains of Central Greece
Landforms of Euboea (regional unit)
Mountains of Greece